Fungicides are biocidal chemical compounds or biological organisms used to kill parasitic fungi or their spores. A fungistatic inhibits their growth. Fungi can cause serious damage in agriculture, resulting in critical losses of yield, quality, and profit. Fungicides are used both in agriculture and to fight fungal infections in animals. Chemicals used to control oomycetes, which are not fungi, are also referred to as fungicides, as oomycetes use the same mechanisms as fungi to infect plants.
Fungicides can either be contact, translaminar or systemic. Contact fungicides are not taken up into the plant tissue and protect only the plant where the spray is deposited. Translaminar fungicides redistribute the fungicide from the upper, sprayed leaf surface to the lower, unsprayed surface. Systemic fungicides are taken up and redistributed through the xylem vessels. Few fungicides move to all parts of a plant. Some are locally systemic, and some move upwardly.

Most fungicides that can be bought retail are sold in a liquid form. A very common active ingredient is sulfur, present at 0.08% in weaker concentrates, and as high as 0.5% for more potent fungicides. Fungicides in powdered form are usually around 90% sulfur and are very toxic. Other active ingredients in fungicides include neem oil, rosemary oil, jojoba oil, the bacterium Bacillus subtilis, and the beneficial fungus Ulocladium oudemansii.

Fungicide residues have been found on food for human consumption, mostly from post-harvest treatments. Some fungicides are dangerous to human health, such as vinclozolin, which has now been removed from use. Ziram is also a fungicide that is toxic to humans with long-term exposure, and fatal if ingested.  A number of fungicides are also used in human health care.

Types

Organic chemicals 

 Mancozeb
 Myclobutanil

Inorganic chemicals 

 Copper
 Sulfur
 Phosphorous acid

Mycoviruses 
Some of the most common fungal crop pathogens are known to suffer from mycoviruses, and it is likely that they are as common as for plant and animal viruses, although not as well studied. Given the obligately parasitic nature of mycoviruses, it is likely that all of these are detrimental to their hosts, and thus are potential biocontrols/biofungicides.

Resistance 

Pathogens respond to the use of fungicides by evolving resistance. In the field several mechanisms of resistance have been identified. The evolution of fungicide resistance can be gradual or sudden. In qualitative or discrete resistance, a mutation (normally to a single gene) produces a race of a fungus with a high degree of resistance. Such resistant varieties also tend to show stability, persisting after the fungicide has been removed from the market. For example, sugar beet leaf blotch remains resistant to azoles years after they were no longer used for control of the disease. This is because such mutations have a high selection pressure when the fungicide is used, but there is low selection pressure to remove them in the absence of the fungicide.

In instances where resistance occurs more gradually, a shift in sensitivity in the pathogen to the fungicide can be seen. Such resistance is polygenic – an accumulation of many mutations in different genes, each having a small additive effect. This type of resistance is known as quantitative or continuous resistance. In this kind of resistance, the pathogen population will revert to a sensitive state if the fungicide is no longer applied.

Little is known about how variations in fungicide treatment affect the selection pressure to evolve resistance to that fungicide. Evidence shows that the doses that provide the most control of the disease also provide the largest selection pressure to acquire resistance, and that lower doses decrease the selection pressure.

In some cases when a pathogen evolves resistance to one fungicide, it automatically obtains resistance to others – a phenomenon known as cross resistance. These additional fungicides are normally of the same chemical family, have the same mode of action, or can be detoxified by the same mechanism. Sometimes negative cross-resistance occurs, where resistance to one chemical class of fungicides increases sensitivity to a different chemical class of fungicides. This has been seen with carbendazim and diethofencarb.

There are also recorded incidences of the evolution of multiple drug resistance by pathogens – resistance to two chemically different fungicides by separate mutation events. For example, Botrytis cinerea is resistant to both azoles and dicarboximide fungicides.

There are several routes by which pathogens can evolve fungicide resistance. The most common mechanism appears to be alteration of the target site, particularly as a defense against a single site of action fungicides. For example, Black Sigatoka, an economically important pathogen of banana, is resistant to the QoI fungicides, due to a single nucleotide change resulting in the replacement of one amino acid (glycine) by another (alanine) in the target protein of the QoI fungicides, cytochrome b. It is presumed that this disrupts the binding of the fungicide to the protein, rendering the fungicide ineffective. Upregulation of target genes can also render the fungicide ineffective. This is seen in DMI-resistant strains of Venturia inaequalis.

Resistance to fungicides can also be developed by efficient efflux of the fungicide out of the cell. Septoria tritici has developed multiple drug resistance using this mechanism. The pathogen had five ABC-type transporters with overlapping substrate specificities that together work to pump toxic chemicals out of the cell.

In addition to the mechanisms outlined above, fungi may also develop metabolic pathways that circumvent the target protein, or acquire enzymes that enable metabolism of the fungicide to a harmless substance.

Fungicide resistance management
The Fungicide Resistance Action Committee (FRAC) has several recommended practices to try to avoid the development of fungicide resistance, especially in at-risk fungicides including Strobilurins such as azoxystrobin. FRAC assigns groups of fungicides into classes where cross-resistance is likely, usually because the active ingredients share a common mode of action. FRAC is organized by CropLife International.

Products should not always be used in isolation, but rather as mixture, or alternate sprays, with another fungicide with a different mechanism of action. The likelihood of the pathogen's developing resistance is greatly decreased by the fact that any resistant isolates to one fungicide will be killed by the other; in other words, two mutations would be required rather than just one. The effectiveness of this technique can be demonstrated by Metalaxyl, a phenylamide fungicide. When used as the sole product in Ireland to control potato blight (Phytophthora infestans), resistance developed within one growing season. However, in countries like the UK where it was marketed only as a mixture, resistance problems developed more slowly.

Fungicides should be applied only when absolutely necessary, especially if they are in an at-risk group. Lowering the amount of fungicide in the environment lowers the selection pressure for resistance to develop.

Manufacturers’ doses should always be followed. These doses are normally designed to give the right balance between controlling the disease and limiting the risk of resistance development. Higher doses increase the selection pressure for single-site mutations that confer resistance, as all strains but those that carry the mutation will be eliminated, and thus the resistant strain will propagate. Lower doses greatly increase the risk of polygenic resistance, as strains that are slightly less sensitive to the fungicide may survive.

It is better to use an integrative pest management approach to disease control rather than relying on fungicides alone. This involves the use of resistant varieties and hygienic practices, such as the removal of potato discard piles and stubble on which the pathogen can overwinter, greatly reducing the titre of the pathogen and thus the risk of fungicide resistance development.

See also 
Antifungal drug
Index of pesticide articles
List of fungicides
PHI-base (Pathogen-Host-Interaction database)
Phytopathology
Plant disease forecasting

References

External links
Fungicide Resistance Action Committee
Fungicide Resistance Action Group, United Kingdom
General Pesticide Information  - National Pesticide Information Center, Oregon State University, United States

 
Mycology
Biocides